Düvenci is a neighborhood of Erciş district of Van Province, Turkey.

Geography 
It is 118 km from Van and 18 km from Erciş.

Population

References 

Villages in Van Province